Bird in a House is the second studio album by the bluegrass/jam band Railroad Earth, released in 2002.

Track listing
"Drag Him Down" (Sheaffer) - 4:19 
"Bird in a House" (Sheaffer) - 5:28 
"Like a Buddha" (Carbone, Sheaffer, Von Dollen) - 7:05 
"Pack a Day" (Skehan) - 3:09 
"Mountain Time" (Sheaffer) - 7:02 
"Give That Boy a Hand" (Goessling, Sheaffer) - 4:19 
"Peace on Earth" (Carbone, Von Dollen) - 4:30 
"Walk on By" (Sheaffer) - 5:57 
"Mighty River" (Sheaffer, Skehan) - 5:28 
"Lois Ann" (Goessling, Sheaffer, Skehan) - 3:47 
"Came Up Smilin'" (Sheaffer) - 5:53 
"Dandelion Wine" (Casal) - 4:38 
"Saddle of the Sun" (Sheaffer) - 4:39

Personnel 

Tim Carbone - piano, violin, vocals 
Buck Dilly - pedal steel 
Andy Goessling - banjo, clarinet, dobro, flute, guitar, ukulele, penny whistle, vox organ, marxophone 
Carey Harmon - percussion, cymbals, drums, vocals, drums (snare) 
Fred Kevorkian - mastering 
Railroad Earth - arranger, producer 
Todd Sheaffer - guitar, trumpet, vocals 
John Siket - mixing 
John Skehan - mandolin, piano, tuba 
Don Sternecker - engineer, mixing 
Dave Von Dollen - bass, trombone (valve), vocals, kalimba

External links
Railroad Earth official website

2002 albums
Railroad Earth albums
Sugar Hill Records albums